George Kennedy Buchanan Henderson  (5 December 1922 – 26 September 1997) was a Scottish Anglican bishop in the 20th century. He was Bishop of Argyll and The Isles and elected Primus of the Scottish Episcopal Church.

Henderson was educated at the University of Edinburgh and ordained in 1945. He began his ordained ministry with a curacy at Christ Church, Glasgow, after which he was the priest in charge of St Bride's Nether Lochaber and then the rector of St Andrew's Fort William. In 1973, he became Dean of the Diocese of Argyll and The Isles and was appointed a Member of the Order of the British Empire (MBE) in 1974. In 1977 he became Bishop of Argyll and The Isles (diocesan bishop of the same diocese). He was elected Primus of the Scottish Episcopal Church in 1990 and retired in 1992.

References

1922 births
1997 deaths
Alumni of the University of Edinburgh
Anglican Church of Canada deans
Provosts of the Cathedral of The Isles
Bishops of Argyll and The Isles
Members of the Order of the British Empire
People educated at Oban High School
Primuses of the Scottish Episcopal Church
20th-century Scottish Episcopalian bishops